The following provides a listing of the individuals who have served as mayor of Fairbanks, Alaska, as well as the ten mayors of the Fairbanks North Star Borough, a county equivalent which includes the city.

Fairbanks, a home rule city in the U.S. state of Alaska, was founded in 1901.  Fairbanks incorporated as a town on November 10, 1903, pursuant to the original laws allowing for communities in Alaska to incorporate.  Following changes in those laws during the latter territorial era, Fairbanks began its current designation as a city ca. 1950.  When statehood became effective for Alaska in 1959, the Alaska Constitution provided for home rule, a status the citizens of Fairbanks ratified the following year.

The Fairbanks North Star Borough, which encompasses the city and several surrounding towns and villages, was established by an act of the Alaska State Legislature in 1963 (Chapter 52, Session Laws of Alaska 1963), and incorporated on January 1, 1964.  The borough seat is in Fairbanks.

Mayors of City of Fairbanks

The city mayor was originally elected from amongst the council.  This was later changed to the mayor being elected separately by voters for a two-year term, but serving as a figurehead, as the city was administered by a manager.  The mayor began serving as the chief administrator of city government, serving a three-year term, in 1992.

Mayors of Fairbanks North Star Borough

The borough mayor's position was originally titled chairman, rather than mayor, until the mid-1970s, given the structure which the legislature had originally established for organized boroughs.  The term of office had changed from two years to three years at around the same time.  The position is non-partisan.

References

Fairbanks North Star Borough, Alaska
Fairbanks